Lucius Annius Fabianus was a Roman Senator who was active at the beginning of the 3rd century. He was ordinary consul in AD 201 with Marcus Nonius Arrius Mucianus as his colleague.

Fabianus came from Caesarea in Mauretania Caesariensis and was in all probability related to the remaining patrician gens Annia. He may be the grandson of Lucius Annius Fabianus, suffect consul for the nundinium of November-December 141.

References 

 Prosopographia Imperii Romani, A 644

Fabianus, Lucius
Imperial Roman consuls